SR (formerly Stabber) is a British rapper that went viral for his single "Welcome to Brixton" in 2020. His follow-up song, "Practice Makes Perfect", was named in the top 10 songs to come out of the U.K. by DJBooth in May 2021.

Career
SR released his debut single "Brucky" in June 2020. "Welcome to Brixton", his breakout single, was released in July 2020; which charted on the UK Singles Chart on 20 May 2021 and peaked at number 93. As of January 2022, “Welcome to Brixton” has received over 35 million views on YouTube and over 100 million streams on Spotify and Apple Music.

In 2021, he released "Snap It", a remix of the song was later released in September the same year, which featured Loski, Sus, SD, and Trap.

Discography

Singles

Awards and nominations

References

Rappers from London

Year of birth missing (living people)
English male rappers
People from Brixton
UK drill musicians
Gangsta rappers
Living people